Bokota Kamana Labama (born 6 April 1985 in Kinshasa) is a naturalized Rwandan football player who plays for Rayon Sport.

Career
Bokota played formerly for Rayon Sport and Armée Patriotique Rwandaise FC. He won the SMS Media footballer of the year award during his first stint with Rayon.

Bokota received a one-year ban from the Rwandese Association Football Federation in 2009, and he moved to DR Congo to play for local sides FC Les Stars and DC Motema Pembe. In August 2011, he signed a two-year contract with Rayon Sport, beginning a second stint with the Rwandan club.

On 8 August 2012, Amavubi striker Bokota Labama has joined Kiyovu Sports on a one-year deal.

International career
Bokota is currently member of the Rwanda national football team. His country of birth is the Democratic Republic of Congo.

International goals
Scores and results list Rwanda's goal tally first.

References

External links

1985 births
Living people
Rwandan footballers
Association football forwards
Rwanda international footballers
APR F.C. players
Rayon Sports F.C. players
Footballers from Kinshasa
Rwandan people of Democratic Republic of the Congo descent
AS Vita Club players
Daring Club Motema Pembe players